Acontias gracilicauda, the slendertail lance skink or thin-tailed legless skink, is a species of skink. It is found in the Republic of South Africa (Eastern Cape Province, Mpumalanga, Free State, North-West Province, Gauteng, KwaZulu-Natal) and Lesotho. Acontias namaquensis was formerly included in this species as a subspecies, but is now recognized as a distinct species.

Description
Adult males measure on average  and adult females  in snout–vent length. It has no limbs, like other members of its genus.

References

Further reading
 Bauer, A.M., and Branch, W.R. (2003). The herpetofauna of the Richtersveld National Park, Northern Cape Province, Republic of South Africa. Herpetological Natural History 8:111-160 [2001]
 
 Essex, R. 1925. Descriptions of two new species of the genus Acontias and notes on some other lizards found in the Cape Province. Rec. Albany Mus. 3: 332–342.
 

Acontias
Skinks of Africa
Reptiles of Lesotho
Reptiles of South Africa
Reptiles described in 1925
Taxa named by Robert Essex (herpetologist)